Edmund Nuttall may refer to:
 Sir Edmund Nuttall, 1st Baronet, British civil engineer, head of Edmund Nuttall Limited
 Edmund Nuttall (priest), Canon of Windsor
 Edmund Nuttall Limited, now BAM Nuttall